Line 1 of Fuzhou Metro is a north-south line of the Fuzhou Metro network in Fuzhou, Fujian Province, China. This line is the first operating metro line in the Fuzhou Metro system, inaugurated on May 18, 2016. The north section opened on 6 January 2017. This line is colored red on system maps.

The construction of Line 1 is divided into two phases. This part of Line 1 is 24.89 km in length and has 21 stations. This part is 4.921 km long.

Service Schedule

Route 
Line 1 is a metro rail line running from north to south in Fuzhou metropolitan area. It operates between Xiangfeng Station and Sanjiangkou Station, running through Fuzhou Railway Station, Dongjiekou Station, Nanmendou Station, Sanchajie Station, Chengmen Station, and Fuzhou South Railway Station, all of which are cities' major transportation junctions and proposed transfer stations with other subway lines.

Stations

Operating hours 
During the first few months of operation, only the south section of Line 1 was in operation. The hours of operation during that time were from 7:00 to 20:20.

After the north section of the line opened, the hours of operation were extended. Nowadays, Line 1 begins operations at 6:30 and ends operations at 23:00.

Rolling stock

See also 
 List of metro systems

References

External links 
 Fuzhou Metro – official website 

01
2016 establishments in China
Railway lines opened in 2016